Palmerston  is a suburb in the Canberra, Australia district of Gungahlin. The postcode is 2913. The suburb is named after George Thomas Palmer (1784–1854) who established a settlement in the Canberra region in 1826 called Palmerville, which was later renamed Ginninderra. It was gazetted on 20 March 1991.  Streets are named after mountains and mountain ranges of Australia, with the main street called Kosciuszko Avenue. It is next to the suburbs of Nicholls, Gungahlin, Crace and Franklin. It was the second suburb to be developed in the Gungahlin district, after the industrial suburb of Mitchell. It is bounded by Gungahlin drive and Gundaroo drive.

Urban environment

Palmerston is mainly a residential area with a mix of single homes and duplexes. At the centre of the suburb there are small medical, shopping and community centres. Palmerston Primary School opened in 1994 and a large neighbourhood oval is adjacent to the school. A number of cyclepaths cross the suburb, with pedestrian and cycle underpasses at several road crossings. Fruit trees, including plums and apples are scattered along the public thoroughfares of Palmerston. ACTION bus routes 21 and 22 traverse Kosciuszko Avenue, as well as 23 and the 24 bus routes going through half of Palmerston, connecting Palmerston with Gungahlin Town Centre,  Franklin and  Nicholls.

Geology

Palmerston is underlaid by the Canberra Formation from the late middle Silurian age.
The area was studied in more detail than many other parts of Canberra by J P Ceplecha from the ANU in 1971.

Mostly the Canberra Formation is slaty shale and mudstone.  A layer of ashstone has been folded to form 75 meter wide exposures on the surface.  These are in the shape of an ear of corn with the major axis pointing north north east.  The major axis is determined by an anticline.  A syncline determines the western side of the ashstone, with an anticline further to the west.  A triangle of siltstone has been 
lifted up by faults into the western corner of Palmerston. 
A long fault aligned with the folds follows along the east side of Ginninderra Creek.
The Winslade Fault comes in from the south heads north and joins up with the above long fault.
The Gungahlin fault also parallels the folds and cuts through the east side of Palmerston.  It forms the eastern limit of the ashstone.

Footnotes

Suburbs of Canberra